Universitas Cantat is the presentation forum of the musical life of the academic centers from entire world. Each year the leading university choirs meet in Poznań.

History
The International Festival of University Choirs was organised for the first time in 1998. It is non-competitive. The idea of the event comes from the Rector of the Adam Mickiewicz University, while the organisers are the University, the AMU Chamber Choir and AMU Chamber Choir Friends' Association. The organisers would like to establish a musical bridge connecting universities from all over the world. His artistic director is Polish conductor Krzysztof Szydzisz. Around 6000 students from 23 countries participated in eleven festival editions.

The festival concerts, which take place in the University Concert Hall and other venues of the Wielkopolska Province, aim at showing the rich musical variety of the groups and culture of the represented countries (the choirs perform music from the country of origin), creating atmosphere of openness and tolerance and inspiring cultural exchange.

The very important assumption of the festival is to present Polish music to the foreign participants - every other year all invited singers work together on the Polish contemporary work. The culmination of the event is the final concert that includes each choir presentation and the performance of the Polish contemporary piece prepared during the workshops by the massed choirs.

Till then, except performed
 1998 – "Litania ad Spiritum Sanctum" Zbigniew Kozub,
 1999 – "Angelus" Wojciech Kilar,
 2000 – "Beati estis" Zbigniew Kobus,
 2001 – "Ad Iuventatem" Marek Jasiński,
 2002 – Symphony "Nihil homine Mirabilius" Krzesimir Dębski,
 2003 – II Symphony "Ver Redit" Krzesimir Dębski,
 2005 – Symphony "Festinemus amare homines" Paweł Łukaszewski,
 2007 – "Raptus Europae" Marek Jasiński,
 2009 – "Exegi Monumentum" Romuald Twardowski,
 2011 – "Amor Vincit", music: Miłosz Bembinow, text: fragments of "Carmina Burana"
 2013 – "Origo Mundi", music: Jacek Sykulski, text: fragments of "Metamorphosis" by Ovid
 2015 – "Arion", music: Zuzanna Koziej, text: fragments of "Fasti" by Ovid

Organizers 
 Adam Mickiewicz University in Poznań 
 Chamber Choir of Adam Mickiewicz University in Poznań
 The Adam Mickiewicz University Foundation
 AMU Chamber Choir Friends' Association.

Patrons 
 Patronage - Rector AMU prof. Bronisław Marciniak
 Honorary Patronage - President of Poland Bronisław Komorowski

References

External links
 International Festival of University Choirs "Universitas Cantat" official site

Music festivals in Poland
Choral festivals
Summer events in Poland